Forever Marilyn is a giant statue of Marilyn Monroe designed by Seward Johnson. The statue is a representation of one of the most famous images of Monroe, taken from Billy Wilder's 1955 film The Seven Year Itch. Created in 2011, the statue has been displayed in a variety of locations in the United States, as well as in Australia.

Design and locations
The   sculpture, manufactured of painted stainless steel and aluminium, is a super-sized tribute to Marilyn Monroe's iconic scene from Billy Wilder's 1955 infidelity comedy, The Seven-Year Itch, with the figure capturing the instant a blast of air from a NYC subway grate raises her white dress.

The statue was displayed at Pioneer Court part of the Magnificent Mile section of Chicago, Illinois, before it was moved in 2012 to the corner of Palm Canyon Drive and Tahquitz Canyon Way in Palm Springs, California.

It was given a farewell sendoff during the Palm Springs Village Fest on March 27, 2014, and was then relocated to the 42-acre Grounds for Sculpture (GFS) in Hamilton, New Jersey as part of a 2014 retrospective honoring Seward Johnson. Due to its popularity, the statue remained on display at the GFS until September 2015, after the official end of the retrospective.

The statue was then displayed in 2016 in Rosalind Park in the Australian city of Bendigo in connection with the Bendigo Art Gallery's Marilyn Monroe exhibition.

In 2018, the statue was displayed at Latham Park in Stamford, Connecticut, as part of a large public art exhibition honoring the works of Seward Johnson. Thirty-six sculptures were placed throughout streets and parks in Downtown Stamford, with Forever Marilyn being the highlight of the exhibit.

On 25 September 2019 Palm Springs mayor Robert Moon announced the statue's return to Palm Springs as a permanent fixture. On 3 February 2021 it was announced that the statue – long stored in a dismantled state in New Jersey – would be erected on Museum Way just east of the Palm Springs Art Museum with an unveiling date of 18 April 2021. According to the announcement, Forever Marilyn is set to remain in Palm Springs for up to three years: in two years time the statue's local economic impact is scheduled to be reviewed and its future decided. As of June 2021 litigation seeking to block the erection of Forever Marilyn continued in the California courts: however the statue was "unveiled" - albeit two months behind schedule - on 20 June 2021,<ref></https://www.freemalaysiatoday.com/category/leisure/entertainment/2021/06/25/marilyn-monroe-statue-returns-to-palm-springs-to-cheers-and-jeers</ref> with the Riverside County Superior Court dismissing four of the Committee to Relocate Marilyn's purported causes of action on 18 July 2021, with the Committee's remaining two purported causes being dismissed by the Riverside County Superior Court on 9 September 2021.

Reception
In August and September 2011 the statue was vandalized three times, most recently being splashed with red paint. According to the executive director of the Chicago Public Arts Group, "In our society, we have little room for sexually expressive images... The social contract doesn't work, because it is itself laden with political meaning, and provocative meaning and sexual meaning."

The public, however, remains enthusiastic: "Forever Marilyn journeyed back to Hamilton in April 2014, arriving at the Grounds for Sculpture on a truck as two dozen people cheered and took pictures. During the cross-country journey, people snapped photos of the sculpture in parking lots and along highways and posted them on social media."

At least one full size counterfeit is known to have been created and displayed, as a discarded sculpture was photographed in a dump after being displayed outside a business center in Guigang, China. A full-size counterfeit is used in the 2017 Chinese drama film, Angels Wear White.

In 2021, the statue was debated on the TV programme Good Morning Britain. The statue was defended from accusations of misogyny by Monroe impersonator Suzie Kennedy.

References

External links
 The Work of Seward Johnson

2011 sculptures
Colossal statues in Australia
Cultural depictions of Marilyn Monroe
Outdoor sculptures in California
Outdoor sculptures in Chicago
Outdoor sculptures in New Jersey
Tourist attractions in Palm Springs, California
Sculptures by John Seward Johnson II
Sculptures of women in California
Sculptures of women in Illinois
Sculptures of women in New Jersey
Stainless steel sculptures in the United States
Statues in California
Statues in Illinois
Statues in New Jersey
Steel sculptures in California
Steel sculptures in Illinois
Steel sculptures in New Jersey
Colossal statues in the United States
Vandalized works of art in the United States
Portraits of actors